The 1994 NCAA Division II women's basketball tournament was the 13th annual tournament hosted by the NCAA to determine the national champion of Division II women's  collegiate basketball in the United States.

Defending  champions North Dakota State defeated Cal State San Bernardino in the championship game, 89–56, to claim the Bison's third NCAA Division II national title. This was North Dakota State's third title in four years and would go on to be the second of four consecutive titles for the Bison.

The championship rounds were contested in Fargo, North Dakota.

Regionals

South - Carrollton, Georgia
Location: Health and Physical Education Center Host: University of West Georgia

East - Pleasantville, New York
Location: Wilcox Hall Gymnasium Host: Pace University

North Central - Grand Forks, North Dakota
Location: Hyslop Sports Center Host: University of North Dakota

South Central - St. Joseph, Missouri
Location: MWSC Fieldhouse Host: Missouri Western State College

West - Portland, Oregon
Location: PSU Gymnasium Host: Portland State University

New England - Waltham, Massachusetts
Location: Dana Center Host: Bentley College

South Atlantic - Wingate, North Carolina
Location: Cuddy Arena Host: Wingate College

Great Lakes - Rochester, Michigan
Location: Lepley Sports Center Host: Oakland University

Elite Eight - Fargo, North Dakota
Location: Bison Sports Arena Host: North Dakota State University

All-tournament team
 Darci Steere, North Dakota State
 Chery’ll Few, Cal State San Bernardino
 Kasey Morlock, North Dakota State
 Jenni Rademacher, North Dakota State
 Kim Young, Cal State San Bernardino

See also
 1994 NCAA Division II men's basketball tournament
 1994 NCAA Division I women's basketball tournament
 1994 NCAA Division III women's basketball tournament
 1994 NAIA Division I women's basketball tournament
 1994 NAIA Division II women's basketball tournament

References
 1994 NCAA Division II women's basketball tournament jonfmorse.com

 
NCAA Division II women's basketball tournament
1994 in North Dakota